Antonio Gandusio (29 July 1875 – 23 May 1951) was an Italian film actor. He appeared in 34 films between 1914 and 1948. He was born in Rovinj (today Croatia) and died in Milan, Italy.

Selected filmography

 The Story of a Poor Young Man (1920)
 Signora dell'Autobus (1933)
 Territorial Militia (1935)
 The Ancestor (1936)
 Adam's Tree (1936)
 Abandon All Hope (1937)
 For Men Only (1938)
 We Were Seven Sisters (1937)
 We Were Seven Widows (1939)
 Frenzy (1939)
 At Your Orders, Madame (1939)
 We Were Seven Widows (1939)
 Cose dell'altro Mondo (1939)
 Mille chilometri al minuto (1939)
 Manovre d'Amore (1940)
 Stasera niente di nuovo (1942)
 The Women Next Door (1942)
 Il Nostro prossimo (1942)
 Wedding Day (1942)
 Gioco d'azzardo (1942)
 Il viaggio del signor Perrichon (1943)
 La signora in nero (1943)
 La prigione (1943)
 Lively Teresa (1944)
 Three Girls Looking for Husbands (1944)
 Scadenza 30 giorni (1944)
 Processo delle zitelle (1944)
 La signora è servita (1946)
 La sconosciuta di San Marino (1946/48)
 L'orfanella delle stelle (1947)
 S.O.S. Submarine (1948)
 La sirena del golfo - Ma chi te lo fa fare? (1948/52)
 C'era una volta Angelo Musco (1953)
 La valigia dei sogni (1953)

References

External links

1875 births
1951 deaths
Italian male film actors
Italian male silent film actors
Istrian Italian people
People from Rovinj
20th-century Italian male actors